Abbey Hey is an area of Gorton, in the city of Manchester, England. It is known mainly for Debdale Park, Wright Robinson College, Parkstone Park also known as Cat Valley field, the donkey sanctuary & Delamere Park

Sports
Although located just outside the boundaries, its local football club is Abbey Hey F.C.

Abbey Hey is in very close proximity to the Belle Vue Stadium, home to the Belle Vue Aces speedway team and Belle Vue sports village.

Transport
Due to its location, easy transport to Manchester City Centre is provided both by rail at the Gorton railway station or by a variety of Stagecoach bus routes.

 7: Ashton-under-Lyne – Gorton – Reddish – Stockport
 7A: Ashton-under-Lyne – Gorton – Reddish – Stockport
 7B: Ashton-under-Lyne – Droylsden – Reddish – Stockport
 171: Newton Heath – Gorton – Levenshulme – East Didsbury – Withington Hospital 
 172: Newton Heath – Gorton – Levenshulme – West Didsbury – Chorlton-cum-Hardy

Geography

Governance
The area is in the Manchester Gorton parliamentary constituency which has been represented in Westminster by Afzal Khan since June 2017.

Following a boundary review in 2017 the Local Government Boundary Commission for England announced that Abbey Hey would form part of a new electoral ward named Gorton and Abbey Hey for the local elections 2018. Abbey Hey had previously been part of Gorton North electoral ward.

References

Areas of Manchester